Amereh or Amareh or Amreh may refer to:
 Amereh, Markazi
 Amreh, Amol, Mazandaran Province
 Amreh, Sari, Mazandaran Province
 Amereh, Qom